The 2022 LSU Tigers baseball team represented Louisiana State University in the 2022 NCAA Division I baseball season. The Tigers played their home games at Alex Box Stadium.

After the season, pitcher Eric Reyzelman was picked in the 5th round of the MLB Draft by the New York Yankees.

Previous season
The Tigers' season was marked with inconsistency, as the team began the year 15–3 in non-conference play, but then struggled against their early SEC competition, going 1–8 through their first three series. The Tigers finished their SEC schedule 12–9 after the rough start, yet went one-and-done in the SEC Tournament after losing their opener to Georgia, going winless in the SEC Tournament for the first time since 2005. Still, the Tigers earned a birth in the NCAA Tournament, where they won the Eugene Regional by beating regional host Oregon despite losing their opening game. After advancing to the Knoxville Super Regional, the Tigers' season ended after losing to No. 3 overall seeded Tennessee in two games. The Tigers finished 2021 38–25 overall, 13–17 in the SEC, with a final ranking of 18 in both the USA Today Coaches' and D1 Baseball Polls.

Preseason

SEC Coaches poll
The SEC coaches poll was released in February at the SEC Media Days.

Preseason All-SEC teams
The preseason All-SEC teams was revealed in February at the SEC Media Days.

Personnel

Roster

Coaching Staff

Schedule and results

Schedule Source:
*Rankings are based on the team's current ranking in the D1Baseball poll.

Standings

Results

Rankings

References

LSU
LSU Tigers baseball seasons
LSU Tigers baseball
LSU